The birds of the Torres Strait Islands are of particular interest to Australian birders because the islands are home to, and visited by, birds which some are New Guinea species. A number of islands are found in Australia, but a few are found in Papua New Guinea.

Access
Access to these islands is not easy.  Permission to visit is required from the island councils.  The few birders who visit, do so on pre-organised trips by chartered yacht or, occasionally, on day-trips by chartered light aircraft.  Saibai and Boigu have airstrips.

List of birds
The following list is annotated with initials indicating which species have been recorded.  Because these islands have not been thoroughly surveyed or regularly monitored by birders, it is very likely that the list underestimates the number of species breeding on or visiting them.

This list's taxonomic treatment (designation and sequence of orders, families and species) and nomenclature (common and scientific names) follow the conventions of The Clements Checklist of Birds of the World, 2022 edition. The family accounts at the beginning of each heading reflect this taxonomy, as do the species counts in each family account. Introduced and accidental species are included in the total counts for Torres Strait Islands.

The following tags have been used to highlight several categories. The commonly occurring native species do not fall into any of these categories:

(A) Accidental - a species that rarely or accidentally occurs in the Torres Strait Islands.
(I) Introduced - a species introduced to the Torres Strait Islands as a consequence, direct or indirect, of human actions

Cassowaries and emu
Order: StruthioniformesFamily: Casuariidae

The cassowaries are large flightless birds native to Australia and New Guinea.

Southern cassowary, Casuarius casuarius
Emu, Dromaius novaehollandiae

Magpie goose
Order: AnseriformesFamily: Anseranatidae

The family contains a single species, the magpie goose. It was an early and distinctive offshoot of the anseriform family tree, diverging after the screamers and before all other ducks, geese and swans, sometime in the late Cretaceous.

Magpie goose, Anseranas semipalmata

Ducks, geese, and waterfowl
Order: AnseriformesFamily: Anatidae

Anatidae includes the ducks and most duck-like waterfowl, such as geese and swans. These birds are adapted to an aquatic existence with webbed feet, flattened bills, and feathers that are excellent at shedding water due to an oily coating.

Spotted whistling-duck, Dendrocygna guttata 
Plumed whistling-duck, Dendrocygna eytoni 
Wandering whistling-duck, Dendrocygna arcuata
Black swan, Cygnus atratus
Radjah shelduck, Radjah radjah 
Green pygmy-goose, Nettapus pulchellus 
Garganey, Spatula querquedula
Pacific black duck, Anas superciliosa
Gray teal, Anas gracilis 
Chestnut teal, Anas castanea   
Pink-eared duck, Malacorhynchus membranaceus 
Hardhead, Aythya australis

Megapodes
Order: GalliformesFamily: Megapodiidae

The Megapodiidae are stocky, medium-large chicken-like birds with small heads and large feet. All but the malleefowl occupy jungle habitats and most have brown or black colouring.

Yellow-legged brushturkey, Talegalla fuscirostris
Australian brushturkey, Alectura lathami
Orange-footed scrubfowl, Megapodius reinwardt

Pheasants, grouse, and allies
Order: GalliformesFamily: Phasianidae

The Phasianidae are a family of terrestrial birds. In general, they are plump (although they vary in size) and have broad, relatively short wings.

Brown quail, Synoicus ypsilophorus 
Blue-breasted quail, Synoicus chinensis

Grebes
Order: PodicipediformesFamily: Podicipedidae

Grebes are small to medium-large freshwater diving birds. They have lobed toes and are excellent swimmers and divers. However, they have their feet placed far back on the body, making them quite ungainly on land.

Australasian grebe, Tachybaptus novaehollandiae

Pigeons and doves
Order: ColumbiformesFamily: Columbidae

Pigeons and doves are stout-bodied birds with short necks and short slender bills with a fleshy cere.

Rock pigeon, Columba livia
Amboyna cuckoo-dove, Macropygia amboinensis
Brown cuckoo-dove, Macropygia phasianella
Asian emerald dove, Chalcophaps longirostris
Pacific emerald dove, Chalcophaps longirostris
Stephan's dove, Chalcophaps stephani 
New Guinea bronzewing, Henicophaps albifrons
Diamond dove, Geopelia cuneata
Peaceful dove, Geopelia striata
Bar-shouldered dove, Geopelia humeralis
Cinnamon ground dove, Gallicolumba rufigula
Thick-billed ground-pigeon, Trugon terrestris
Sclater's crowned-pigeon, Goura sclaterii
Wompoo fruit-dove, Ptilinopus magnificus
Pink-spotted fruit-dove, Ptilinopus perlatus
Orange-fronted fruit-dove, Ptilinopus aurantiifrons
Superb fruit-dove, Ptilinopus superbus
Rose-crowned fruit-dove, Ptilinopus regina
Coroneted fruit-dove, Ptilinopus coronulatus
Orange-bellied fruit-dove, Ptilinopus iozonus
Pacific imperial-pigeon, Ducula pacifica
Purple-tailed imperial-pigeon, Ducula rufigaster
Island imperial-pigeon, Ducula pistrinaria
Pinon's imperial-pigeon, Ducula pinon
Collared imperial-pigeon, Ducula mullerii
Zoe's imperial-pigeon, Ducula zoeae
Pied imperial-pigeon, Ducula bicolor
Torresian imperial-pigeon, Ducula spilorrhoa
Topknot pigeon, Lopholaimus antarcticus

Bustards
Order: OtidiformesFamily: Otididae

Bustards are large terrestrial birds mainly associated with dry open country and steppes in the Old World. They are omnivorous and nest on the ground. They walk steadily on strong legs and big toes, pecking for food as they go. They have long broad wings with "fingered" wingtips and striking patterns in flight. Many have interesting mating displays.

Australian bustard, Ardeotis australis

Cuckoos
Order: CuculiformesFamily: Cuculidae

The family Cuculidae includes cuckoos, roadrunners and anis. These birds are of variable size with slender bodies, long tails and strong legs. The Old World cuckoos are brood parasites.

Greater black coucal, Centropus menbeki 
Lesser black coucal, Centropus bernsteini 
Pheasant coucal, Centropus phasianinus 
Dwarf koel, Microdynamis parva
Asian koel, Eudynamys scolopaceus
Pacific koel, Eudynamys orientalis
Channel-billed cuckoo, Scythrops novaehollandiae
Horsfield's bronze-cuckoo, Chrysococcyx basalis
Black-eared cuckoo, Chrysococcyx osculans
Shining bronze-cuckoo, Chrysococcyx lucidus
Little bronze-cuckoo, Chrysococcyx minutillus
Pallid cuckoo, Cacomantis pallidus
Chestnut-breasted cuckoo, Cacomantis castaneiventris
Fan-tailed cuckoo, Cacomantis flabelliformis
Brush cuckoo, Cacomantis variolosus
Himalayan cuckoo, Cuculus saturatus 
Oriental cuckoo, Cuculus optatus

Frogmouths
Order: CaprimulgiformesFamily: Podargidae

The frogmouths are a group of nocturnal birds related to the nightjars. They are named for their large flattened hooked bill and huge frog-like gape, which they use to take insects.

Tawny frogmouth, Podargus strigoides
Marbled frogmouth, Podargus ocellatus
Papuan frogmouth, Podargus papuensis

Nightjars and allies
Order: CaprimulgiformesFamily: Caprimulgidae

Nightjars are medium-sized nocturnal birds that usually nest on the ground. They have long wings, short legs and very short bills. Most have small feet, of little use for walking, and long pointed wings. Their soft plumage is camouflaged to resemble bark or leaves.

Spotted nightjar, Eurostopodus argus
White-throated nightjar, Eurostopodus mystacalis
Papuan nightjar, Eurostopodus papuensis
Large-tailed nightjar, Caprimulgus macrurus

Owlet-nightjars
Order: CaprimulgiformesFamily: Aegothelidae

The owlet-nightjars are small nocturnal birds related to the nightjars and frogmouths. They are insectivores which hunt mostly in the air. Their soft plumage is a mixture of browns and paler shades.

Australian owlet-nightjar, Aegotheles cristatus
Barred owlet-nightjar, Aegotheles bennettii

Swifts
Order: CaprimulgiformesFamily: Apodidae

Swifts are small birds which spend the majority of their lives flying. These birds have very short legs and never settle voluntarily on the ground, perching instead only on vertical surfaces. Many swifts have long swept-back wings which resemble a crescent or boomerang.

Papuan spinetailed swift, Mearnsia novaeguineae 
White-throated needletail, Hirundapus caudacutus
Glossy swiftlet, Collocalia esculenta 
Australian swiftlet, Aerodramus terraereginae
Uniform swiftlet, Aerodramus vanikorensis
Pacific swift, Apus pacificus
House swift, Apus nipalensis (A)

Rails, gallinules, and coots
Order: GruiformesFamily: Rallidae

Rallidae is a large family of small to medium-sized birds which includes the rails, crakes, coots and gallinules. Typically they inhabit dense vegetation in damp environments near lakes, swamps or rivers. In general they are shy and secretive birds, making them difficult to observe. Most species have strong legs and long toes which are well adapted to soft uneven surfaces. They tend to have short, rounded wings and to be weak fliers.

Bare-eyed rail, Gymnocrex plumbeiventris
Chestnut rail, Gallirallus castaneoventris 
Buff-banded rail, Gallirallus philippensis
Dusky moorhen, Gallinula tenebrosa
Eurasian coot, Fulica atra
Australasian swamphen, Porphyrio melanotus
Pale-vented bush-hen, Amaurornis moluccana
White-browed crake, Poliolimnas cinereus
Red-necked crake, Rallina tricolor
Spotless crake, Zapornia tabuensis

Cranes
Order: GruiformesFamily: Gruidae

Cranes are large, long-legged and long-necked birds. Unlike the similar-looking but unrelated herons, cranes fly with necks outstretched, not pulled back. Most have elaborate and noisy courting displays or "dances".

Brolga, Antigone rubicunda

Thick-knees
Order: CharadriiformesFamily: Burhinidae

The thick-knees are a group of largely tropical waders in the family Burhinidae. They are found worldwide within the tropical zone, with some species also breeding in temperate Europe and Australia. They are medium to large waders with strong black or yellow-black bills, large yellow eyes and cryptic plumage. Despite being classed as waders, most species have a preference for arid or semi-arid habitats.

Bush thick-knee, Burhinus grallarius
Beach thick-knee, Esacus magnirostris

Stilts and avocets
Order: CharadriiformesFamily: Recurvirostridae

Recurvirostridae is a family of large wading birds, which includes the avocets and stilts. The avocets have long legs and long up-curved bills. The stilts have extremely long legs and long, thin straight bills.

Pied stilt, Himantopus leucocephalus

Oystercatchers
Order: CharadriiformesFamily: Haematopodidae

The oystercatchers are large and noisy plover-like birds, with strong bills used for smashing or prising open molluscs.

Pied oystercatcher, Haematopus longirostris
Sooty oystercatcher, Haematopus fuliginosus

Plovers and lapwings
Order: CharadriiformesFamily: Charadriidae

The family Charadriidae includes the plovers, dotterels and lapwings. They are small to medium-sized birds with compact bodies, short, thick necks and long, usually pointed, wings. They are found in open country worldwide, mostly in habitats near water.

Black-bellied plover, Pluvialis squatarola
Pacific golden-plover, Pluvialis fulva
Masked lapwing, Vanellus miles
Lesser sand-plover, Charadrius mongolus
Greater sand-plover, Charadrius leschenaultii
Double-banded plover, Charadrius bicinctus
Red-capped plover, Charadrius ruficapillus
Oriental plover, Charadrius veredus
Red-kneed dotterel, Erythrogonys cinctus
Black-fronted dotterel, Elseyornis melanops

Jacanas
Order: CharadriiformesFamily: Jacanidae

The Jacanas are a group of tropical waders in the family Jacanidae. They are found throughout the tropics. They are identifiable by their huge feet and claws which enable them to walk on floating vegetation in the shallow lakes that are their preferred habitat.

Comb-crested jacana, Irediparra gallinacea

Sandpipers and allies
Order: CharadriiformesFamily: Scolopacidae

Scolopacidae is a large diverse family of small to medium-sized shorebirds including the sandpipers, curlews, godwits, shanks, tattlers, woodcocks, snipes, dowitchers and phalaropes. The majority of these species eat small invertebrates picked out of the mud or soil. Variation in length of legs and bills enables multiple species to feed in the same habitat, particularly on the coast, without direct competition for food.

Whimbrel, Numenius phaeopus
Little curlew, Numenius minutus 
Far Eastern curlew, Numenius madagascariensis
Bar-tailed godwit, Limosa lapponica
Black-tailed godwit, Limosa limosa
Ruddy turnstone, Arenaria interpres 
Great knot, Calidris tenuirostris
Red knot, Calidris canutus
Broad-billed sandpiper, Calidris falcinellus 
Sharp-tailed sandpiper, Calidris acuminata
Curlew sandpiper, Calidris ferruginea 
Long-toed stint, Calidris subminuta
Red-necked stint, Calidris ruficollis
Sanderling, Calidris alba
Pectoral sandpiper, Calidris melanotos 
Latham's snipe, Gallinago hardwickii 
Swinhoe's snipe, Gallinago megala 
Terek sandpiper, Xenus cinereus
Red-necked phalarope, Phalaropus lobatus (A)
Common sandpiper, Actitis hypoleucos  
Gray-tailed tattler, Tringa brevipes 
Wandering tattler, Tringa incana 
Common greenshank, Tringa nebularia
Marsh sandpiper, Tringa stagnatilis
Wood sandpiper, Tringa glareola   
Common redshank, Tringa totanus (A)

Buttonquail
Order: CharadriiformesFamily: Turnicidae

The buttonquail are small, drab, running birds which resemble the true quails. The female is the brighter of the sexes and initiates courtship. The male incubates the eggs and tends the young.

Red-backed buttonquail, Turnix maculosa
Red-chested buttonquail, Turnix pyrrhothorax

Pratincoles and coursers
Order: CharadriiformesFamily: Glareolidae

Glareolidae is a family of wading birds comprising the pratincoles, which have short legs, long pointed wings and long forked tails, and the coursers, which have long legs, short wings and long, pointed bills which curve downwards.

Australian pratincole, Stiltia isabella
Oriental pratincole, Glareola maldivarum

Skuas and jaegers
Order: CharadriiformesFamily: Stercorariidae

The family Stercorariidae are, in general, medium to large birds, typically with grey or brown plumage, often with white markings on the wings. They nest on the ground in temperate and arctic regions and are long-distance migrants.

Pomarine jaeger, Stercorarius pomarinus

Gulls, terns, and skimmers
Order: CharadriiformesFamily: Laridae

Laridae is a family of medium to large seabirds, the gulls, terns, and skimmers. Gulls are typically grey or white, often with black markings on the head or wings. They have stout, longish bills and webbed feet. Terns are a group of generally medium to large seabirds typically with grey or white plumage, often with black markings on the head. Most terns hunt fish by diving but some pick insects off the surface of fresh water. Terns are generally long-lived birds, with several species known to live in excess of 30 years.

Silver gull, Chroicocephalus novaehollandiae
Black-headed gull, Chroicocephalus ridibundus (A)
Brown noddy, Anous stolidus
Black noddy, Anous minutus
Lesser noddy, Anous tenuirostris
White tern, Gygis alba
Sooty tern, Onychoprion fuscatus
Gray-backed tern, Onychoprion lunatus (A)
Bridled tern, Onychoprion anaethetus
Little tern, Sternula albifrons
Gull-billed tern, Gelochelidon nilotica
Caspian tern, Hydroprogne caspia
White-winged tern, Chlidonias leucopterus
Whiskered tern, Chlidonias hybrida
Roseate tern, Sterna dougallii
Black-naped tern, Sterna sumatrana
Common tern, Sterna hirundo
Great crested tern, Thalasseus bergii
Lesser crested tern, Thalasseus bengalensis

Tropicbirds
Order: PhaethontiformesFamily: Phaethontidae

Tropicbirds are slender white birds of tropical oceans, with exceptionally long central tail feathers. Their heads and long wings have black markings.

White-tailed tropicbird, Phaethon lepturus
Red-tailed tropicbird, Phaethon rubricauda

Southern storm-petrels
Order: ProcellariiformesFamily: Oceanitidae

The southern storm-petrels are relatives of the petrels and are the smallest seabirds. They feed on planktonic crustaceans and small fish picked from the surface, typically while hovering. The flight is fluttering and sometimes bat-like.

Wilson's storm-petrel, Oceanites oceanicus
White-faced storm-petrel, Pelagodroma marina 
White-bellied storm-petrel, Fregetta grallaria
Black-bellied storm-petrel, Fregetta tropica

Shearwaters and petrels
Order: ProcellariiformesFamily: Procellariidae

The procellariids are the main group of medium-sized "true petrels", characterised by united nostrils with medium septum and a long outer functional primary.

Kermadec petrel, Pterodroma neglecta
Gould's petrel, Pterodroma leucoptera
Antarctic prion, Pachyptila turtur
Tahiti petrel, Pseudobulweria rostrata
Streaked shearwater, Calonectris leucomelas
Flesh-footed shearwater, Ardenna carneipes
Wedge-tailed shearwater, Ardenna pacificus
Sooty shearwater, Ardenna griseus
Short-tailed shearwater, Ardenna tenuirostris
Little shearwater, Puffinus assimilis
Christmas shearwater, Puffinus nativitatis
Tropical shearwater, Puffinus bailloni

Storks
Order: CiconiiformesFamily: Ciconiidae

Storks are large, long-legged, long-necked, wading birds with long, stout bills. Storks are mute, but bill-clattering is an important mode of communication at the nest. Their nests can be large and may be reused for many years. Many species are migratory.

Black-necked stork, Ephippiorhynchus asiaticus

Frigatebirds
Order: SuliformesFamily: Fregatidae

Frigatebirds are large seabirds usually found over tropical oceans. They are large, black-and-white or completely black, with long wings and deeply forked tails. The males have coloured inflatable throat pouches. They do not swim or walk and cannot take off from a flat surface. Having the largest wingspan-to-body-weight ratio of any bird, they are essentially aerial, able to stay aloft for more than a week.

Lesser frigatebird, Fregata ariel 
Great frigatebird, Fregata minor

Boobies and gannets
Order: SuliformesFamily: Sulidae

The sulids comprise the gannets and boobies. Both groups are medium to large coastal seabirds that plunge-dive for fish.

Masked booby, Sula dactylatra
Brown booby, Sula leucogaster
Red-footed booby, Sula sula

Anhingas
Order: SuliformesFamily: Anhingidae

Anhingas or darters are often called "snake-birds" because of their long thin necks, which gives a snake-like appearance when they swim with their bodies submerged. The males have black and dark-brown plumage, an erectile crest on the nape and a larger bill than the female. The females have much paler plumage especially on the neck and underparts. The darters have completely webbed feet and their legs are short and set far back on the body. Their plumage is somewhat permeable, like that of cormorants, and they spread their wings to dry after diving.

Australasian darter, Anhinga novaehollandiae

Cormorants and shags
Order: SuliformesFamily: Phalacrocoracidae

Phalacrocoracidae is a family of medium to large coastal, fish-eating seabirds that includes cormorants and shags. Plumage colouration varies, with the majority having mainly dark plumage, some species being black-and-white and a few being colourful.

Little pied cormorant, Microcarbo melanoleucos
Great cormorant, Phalacrocorax carbo
Little black cormorant, Phalacrocorax sulcirostris
Pied cormorant, Phalacrocorax varius

Pelicans
Order: PelecaniformesFamily: Pelecanidae

Pelicans are large water birds with a distinctive pouch under their beak. As with other members of the order Pelecaniformes, they have webbed feet with four toes.

Australian pelican, Pelecanus conspicillatus

Herons, egrets, and bitterns
Order: PelecaniformesFamily: Ardeidae

The family Ardeidae contains the bitterns, herons and egrets. Herons and egrets are medium to large wading birds with long necks and legs. Bitterns tend to be shorter necked and more wary. Members of Ardeidae fly with their necks retracted, unlike other long-necked birds such as storks, ibises and spoonbills.

Yellow bittern, Ixobrychus sinensis 
Black-backed bittern, Ixobrychus dubius
Black bittern, Ixobrychus flavicollis 
Forest bittern, Zonerodius heliosylus 
Pacific heron, Ardea pacifica
Great-billed heron, Ardea sumatrana
Great egret, Ardea alba 
Intermediate egret, Ardea intermedia
White-faced heron, Egretta novaehollandiae
Little egret, Egretta garzetta  
Pacific reef-heron, Egretta sacra
Pied heron, Egretta picata 
Cattle egret, Bubulcus ibis 
Striated heron, Butorides striata 
Nankeen night-heron, Nycticorax caledonicus

Ibises and spoonbills
Order: PelecaniformesFamily: Threskiornithidae

Threskiornithidae is a family of large terrestrial and wading birds which includes the ibises and spoonbills. They have long, broad wings with 11 primary and about 20 secondary feathers. They are strong fliers and despite their size and weight, very capable soarers.
 
Glossy ibis, Plegadis falcinellus 
Australian ibis, Threskiornis moluccus 
Straw-necked ibis, Threskiornis spinicollis
Royal spoonbill, Platalea regia
Yellow-billed spoonbill, Platalea flavipes

Osprey
Order: AccipitriformesFamily: Pandionidae

The family Pandionidae contains only one species, the osprey. The osprey is a medium-large raptor which is a specialist fish-eater with a worldwide distribution.

Osprey, Pandion haliaetus

Hawks, eagles, and kites
Order: AccipitriformesFamily: Accipitridae

Accipitridae is a family of birds of prey, which includes hawks, eagles, kites, harriers and Old World vultures. These birds have powerful hooked beaks for tearing flesh from their prey, strong legs, powerful talons and keen eyesight.

Black-shouldered kite, Elanus axillaris
Black-breasted kite, Hamirostra melanosternon
Long-tailed honey-buzzard, Henicopernis longicauda 
Square-tailed kite, Lophoictinia isura
Pacific baza, Aviceda subcristata 
New Guinea eagle, Harpyopsis novaeguineae
Little eagle, Hieraaetus morphnoides
Pygmy eagle, Hieraaetus weiskei
Gurney's eagle, Aquila gurneyi 
Wedge-tailed eagle, Aquila audax 
Papuan marsh-harrier, Circus spilothorax
Swamp harrier, Circus approximans
Spotted harrier, Circus assimilis
Variable goshawk, Accipiter hiogaster
Gray goshawk, Accipiter novaehollandiae
Brown goshawk, Accipiter fasciatus 
Collared sparrowhawk, Accipiter cirrocephalus 
Doria's goshawk, Megatriorchis doriae 
Black kite, Milvus migrans 
Whistling kite, Haliastur sphenurus 
Brahminy kite, Haliastur indus
White-bellied sea-eagle, Haliaeetus leucogaster

Barn-owls
Order: StrigiformesFamily: Tytonidae

Barn-owls are medium to large owls with large heads and characteristic heart-shaped faces. They have long strong legs with powerful talons.

Sooty owl, Tyto tenebricosa
Australian masked-owl, Tyto novaehollandiae
Australasian grass-owl, Tyto longimembris
Barn owl, Tyto alba

Owls
Order: StrigiformesFamily: Strigidae

The typical owls are small to large solitary nocturnal birds of prey. They have large forward-facing eyes and ears, a hawk-like beak and a conspicuous circle of feathers around each eye called a facial disk.

Rufous owl, Ninox rufa
Barking owl, Ninox connivens
Southern boobook, Ninox boobook
Morepork, Ninox novaeseelandiae

Hornbills
Order: BucerotiformesFamily: Bucerotidae

Hornbills are a group of birds whose bill is shaped like a cow's horn, but without a twist, sometimes with a casque on the upper mandible. Frequently, the bill is brightly coloured.

Blyth's hornbill, Rhyticeros plicatus
Blyth's hornbill is native to New Guinea and Indonesia. It is possibly found on Saibai Island and the Talbot Islands in the Torres Strait, and would be classified as an accidental, rarely encountered species to these islands. If recorded, this would classify it as Australia's only hornbill species.

Kingfishers
Order: CoraciiformesFamily: Alcedinidae

Kingfishers are medium-sized birds with large heads, long pointed bills, short legs, and stubby tails.

Azure kingfisher, Ceyx azureus
Little kingfisher, Ceyx pusillus
Papuan dwarf-kingfisher, Ceyx pusillus
Laughing kookaburra, Dacelo novaeguineae
Blue-winged kookaburra, Dacelo leachii
Rufous-bellied kookaburra, Dacelo gaudichaud 
Red-backed kingfisher, Todiramphus pyrrhopygius 
Blue-black kingfisher, Todiramphus nigrocyaneus
Forest kingfisher, Todiramphus macleayii 
Torresian kingfisher, Todiramphus sordidus  
Sacred kingfisher, Todiramphus sanctus 
Collared kingfisher, Todiramphus chloris 
Hook-billed kingfisher, Melidora macrorrhina 
Yellow-billed kingfisher, Syma torotoro 
Common paradise-kingfisher, Tanysiptera galatea
Little paradise-kingfisher, Tanysiptera hydrocharis (A)
Buff-breasted paradise-kingfisher, Tanysiptera sylvia

Bee-eaters
Order: CoraciiformesFamily: Meropidae

The bee-eaters are a group of near passerine birds in the family Meropidae. Most species are found in Africa but others occur in southern Europe, Madagascar, Australia and New Guinea. They are characterised by richly coloured plumage, slender bodies and usually elongated central tail feathers. All are colourful and have long downturned bills and pointed wings, which give them a swallow-like appearance when seen from afar.

Blue-tailed bee-eater, Merops philippinus
Rainbow bee-eater, Merops ornatus

Rollers
Order: CoraciiformesFamily: Coraciidae

Rollers resemble crows in size and build, but are more closely related to the kingfishers and bee-eaters. They share the colourful appearance of those groups with blues and browns predominating. The two inner front toes are connected, but the outer toe is not.

Dollarbird, Eurystomus orientalis

Falcons and caracaras
Order: FalconiformesFamily: Falconidae

Falconidae is a family of diurnal birds of prey. They differ from hawks, eagles and kites in that they kill with their beaks instead of their talons.

Nankeen kestrel, Falco cenchroides
Oriental hobby, Falco severus
Australian hobby, Falco longipennis
Brown falcon, Falco berigora
Black falcon, Falco subniger
Peregrine falcon, Falco peregrinus

Cockatoos
Order: PsittaciformesFamily: Cacatuidae

The cockatoos share many features with other parrots including the characteristic curved beak shape and a zygodactyl foot, with two forward toes and two backwards toes. They differ, however in a number of characteristics, including the often spectacular movable headcrest.

Palm cockatoo, Probosciger aterrimus
Red-tailed black-cockatoo, Calyptorhynchus banksii
Sulphur-crested cockatoo, Cacatua galerita

Old World parrots
Order: PsittaciformesFamily: Psittaculidae

Characteristic features of parrots include a strong curved bill, an upright stance, strong legs, and clawed zygodactyl feet. Many parrots are vividly coloured, and some are multi-coloured. Old World parrots are found from Africa east across south and southeast Asia and Oceania to Australia and New Zealand.

Red-winged parrot, Aprosmictus erythropterus
Eclectus parrot, Eclectus roratus 
Red-cheeked parrot, Geoffroyus geoffroyi 
Pale-headed rosella, Platycercus adscitus
Orange-breasted fig-parrot, Cyclopsitta gulielmitertii
Double-eyed fig-parrot, Cyclopsitta diophthalma
Large fig-parrot, Psittaculirostris desmarestii
Red-flanked lorikeet, Charmosyna placentis
Yellow-streaked lory, Chalcopsitta scintillata
Black-capped lory, Lorius lory
Dusky lory, Pseudeos fuscata
Coconut lorikeet, Trichoglossus haematodus
Rainbow lorikeet, Trichoglossus moluccanus
Scaly-breasted lorikeet, Trichoglossus chlorolepidotus

Pittas
Order: PasseriformesFamily: Pittidae

Pittas are medium-sized by passerine standards and are stocky, with fairly long, strong legs, short tails and stout bills. Many are brightly coloured. They spend the majority of their time on wet forest floors, eating snails, insects and similar invertebrates.

Papuan pitta, Erythropitta macklotii
Hooded pitta, Pitta sordida
Noisy pitta, Pitta versicolor

Bowerbirds
Order: PasseriformesFamily: Ptilonorhynchidae

The bowerbirds are small to medium-sized passerine birds. The males notably build a bower to attract a mate. Depending on the species, the bower ranges from a circle of cleared earth with a small pile of twigs in the center to a complex and highly decorated structure of sticks and leaves.

Black-capped catbird, Ailuroedus melanocephalus
Great bowerbird, Chlamydera nuchalis
Fawn-breasted bowerbird, Chlamydera cerviniventris

Australasian treecreepers
Order: PasseriformesFamily: Climacteridae

The Climacteridae are medium-small, mostly brown-coloured birds with patterning on their underparts. They are endemic to Australia and New Guinea.

Brown treecreeper, Climacteris picumnus

Fairywrens
Order: PasseriformesFamily: Maluridae

Maluridae is a family of small, insectivorous passerine birds endemic to Australia and New Guinea. They are socially monogamous and sexually promiscuous, meaning that although they form pairs between one male and one female, each partner will mate with other individuals and even assist in raising the young from such pairings.

Wallace's fairywren, Sipodotus wallacii
Lovely fairywren, Malurus amabilis
Red-backed fairywren, Malurus melanocephalus
Emperor fairywren, Malurus cyanocephalus
White-shouldered fairywren, Malurus alboscapulatus

Honeyeaters
Order: PasseriformesFamily: Meliphagidae

The honeyeaters are a large and diverse family of small to medium-sized birds most common in Australia and New Guinea. They are nectar feeders and closely resemble other nectar-feeding passerines.

Streak-headed honeyeater, Pycnopygius stictocephalus
Puff-backed honeyeater, Meliphaga aruensis
Yellow-spotted honeyeater, Meliphaga notata
Mimic honeyeater, Microptilotis analogus
Yellow-gaped honeyeater, Microptilotis flavirictus
Graceful honeyeater, Microptilotis gracilis
Yellow honeyeater, Stomiopera flava
White-gaped honeyeater, Stomiopera unicolor
Yellow-throated miner, Manorina flavigula
Varied honeyeater, Gavicalis versicolor
Brown-backed honeyeater, Ramsayornis modestus
Bar-breasted honeyeater, Ramsayornis fasciatus
Rufous-banded honeyeater, Conopophila albogularis
Rufous-throated honeyeater, Conopophila rufogularis
Long-billed honeyeater, Melilestes megarhynchus
Ruby-throated myzomela, Myzomela eques 
Dusky myzomela, Myzomela obscura 
Papuan black myzomela, Myzomela nigrita 
Red-headed myzomela, Myzomela erythrocephala
Scarlet myzomela, Myzomela sanguinolenta
Green-backed honeyeater, Glycichaera fallax
Banded honeyeater, Cissomela pectoralis
Brown honeyeater, Lichmera indistincta 
White-streaked honeyeater, Trichodere cockerelli 
Blue-faced honeyeater, Entomyzon cyanotis 
White-throated honeyeater, Melithreptus albogularis 
Tawny-breasted honeyeater, Xanthotis flaviventer
Spotted honeyeater, Xanthotis polygrammus
Little friarbird, Philemon citreogularis
Helmeted friarbird, Philemon buceroides
Silver-crowned friarbird, Philemon argenticeps
Noisy friarbird, Philemon corniculatus

Pardalotes
Order: PasseriformesFamily: Pardalotidae

Pardalotes spend most of their time high in the outer foliage of trees, feeding on insects, spiders, and above all lerps (a type of sap-sucking insect).

Red-browed pardalote, Pardalotus rubricatus
Striated pardalote, Pardalotus striatus

Thornbills and allies
Order: PasseriformesFamily: Acanthizidae

Thornbills are small passerine birds, similar in habits to the tits.

Tropical scrubwren, Sericornis beccarii
Large scrubwren, Sericornis nouhuysi
Weebill, Smicrornis brevirostris
Green-backed gerygone, Gerygone chloronota
Fairy gerygone, Gerygone palpebrosa
Yellow-bellied gerygone, Gerygone chrysogaster
White-throated gerygone, Gerygone olivacea
Large-billed gerygone, Gerygone magnirostris
Mangrove gerygone, Gerygone levigaster

Pseudo-babblers
Order: PasseriformesFamily: Pomatostomidae

The pseudo-babblers are small to medium-sized birds endemic to Australia and New Guinea. They are ground-feeding omnivores and highly social.

Papuan babbler, Pomatostomus isidorei 
Gray-crowned babbler, Pomatostomus temporalis

Quail-thrushes and jewel-babblers
Order: PasseriformesFamily: Cinclosomatidae

The Cinclosomatidae is a family containing jewel-babblers and quail-thrushes.

Painted quail-thrush, Cinclosoma ajax

Cuckooshrikes
Order: PasseriformesFamily: Campephagidae

The cuckooshrikes are small to medium-sized passerine birds. They are predominantly greyish with white and black, although some species are brightly coloured.

Barred cuckooshrike, Coracina lineata
Boyer's cuckooshrike, Coracina boyeri
Black-faced cuckooshrike, Coracina novaehollandiae
White-bellied cuckooshrike, Coracina papuensis
White-winged triller, Lalage sueurii
Varied triller, Lalage leucomela
Common cicadabird, Edolisoma tenuirostre
Black cicadabird, Edolisoma melas

Sittellas
Order: PasseriformesFamily: Neosittidae

The sittellas are a family of small passerine birds found only in Australasia. They resemble treecreepers, but have soft tails.

Papuan sittella, Daphoenositta papuensis
Varied sittella, Daphoenositta chrysoptera

Whistlers and allies
Order: PasseriformesFamily: Pachycephalidae

The family Pachycephalidae includes the whistlers, shrikethrushes, and some of the pitohuis.

Rusty pitohui, Pseudorectes ferrugineus
Gray shrikethrush, Colluricincla harmonica
Little shrikethrush, Colluricincla megarhyncha
Baliem whistler, Pachycephala balim
Black-tailed whistler, Pachycephala melanura
Gray whistler, Pachycephala simplex
Rufous whistler, Pachycephala rufiventris
White-breasted whistler, Pachycephala lanioides

Old World orioles
Order: PasseriformesFamily: Oriolidae

The Old World orioles are colourful passerine birds. They are not related to the New World orioles.

Brown oriole, Oriolus szalayi
Olive-backed oriole, Oriolus sagittatus
Green oriole, Oriolus flavocinctus 
Australasian figbird, Sphecotheres vieilloti

Boatbills
Order: PasseriformesFamily: Machaerirhynchidae

The boatbills have affinities to woodswallows and butcherbirds, and are distributed across New Guinea and northern Queensland.

Yellow-breasted boatbill, Machaerirhynchus flaviventer

Woodswallows, bellmagpies, and allies 
Order: PasseriformesFamily: Artamidae

The woodswallows are soft-plumaged, somber-coloured passerine birds. They are smooth, agile flyers with moderately large, semi-triangular wings. The cracticids: currawongs, bellmagpies and butcherbirds, are similar to the other corvids. They have large, straight bills and mostly black, white or grey plumage. All are omnivorous to some degree.

White-breasted woodswallow, Artamus leucorynchus
White-browed woodswallow, Artamus superciliosus
Black-faced woodswallow, Artamus cinereus
Little woodswallow, Artamus minor
Black-backed butcherbird, Cracticus mentalis 
Pied butcherbird, Cracticus nigrogularis
Hooded butcherbird, Cracticus cassicus
Black butcherbird, Cracticus quoyi 
Australian magpie, Gymnorhina tibicen 
Pied currawong, Strepera graculina

Fantails
Order: PasseriformesFamily: Rhipiduridae

The fantails are small insectivorous birds which are specialist aerial feeders.

Northern fantail, Rhipidura rufiventris
Black thicket-fantail, Rhipidura maculipectus
Willie wagtail, Rhipidura leucophrys
Rufous fantail, Rhipidura rufifrons
Arafura fantail, Rhipidura dryas
Gray fantail, Rhipidura albiscapa
Mangrove fantail, Rhipidura phasiana

Drongos
Order: PasseriformesFamily: Dicruridae

The drongos are mostly black or dark grey in colour, sometimes with metallic tints. They have long forked tails, and some Asian species have elaborate tail decorations. They have short legs and sit very upright when perched, like a shrike. They flycatch or take prey from the ground.

Spangled drongo, Dicrurus bracteatus

Birds-of-paradise
Order: PasseriformesFamily: Paradisaeidae

The birds-of-paradise are best known for the striking plumage possessed by the males of most species, in particular highly elongated and elaborate feathers extending from the tail, wings or head. These plumes are used in courtship displays to attract females.

Trumpet manucode, Phonygammus keraudrenii
Glossy-mantled manucode, Manucodia ater
Raggiana bird-of-paradise, Paradisaea raggiana
Magnificent riflebird, Ptiloris magnificus

Monarch flycatchers
Order: PasseriformesFamily: Monarchidae

The monarch flycatchers are small to medium-sized insectivorous passerines which hunt by flycatching.

Golden monarch, Carterornis chrysomela
Black-faced monarch, Monarcha melanopsis
Black-winged monarch, Monarcha frater
Spectacled monarch, Symposiachrus trivirgatus
Spot-winged monarch, Symposiachrus guttula
Frilled monarch, Arses telescopthalmus
Frill-necked monarch, Arses lorealis
Magpie-lark, Grallina cyanoleuca
Leaden flycatcher, Myiagra rubecula
Broad-billed flycatcher, Myiagra ruficollis
Satin flycatcher, Myiagra cyanoleuca
Restless flycatcher, Myiagra inquieta
Paperbark flycatcher, Myiagra nana
Shining flycatcher, Myiagra alecto

Crows, jays, and magpies
Order: PasseriformesFamily: Corvidae

The family Corvidae includes crows, ravens, jays, choughs, magpies, treepies, nutcrackers and ground jays. Corvids are above average in size among the Passeriformes, and some of the larger species show high levels of intelligence.

Torresian crow, Corvus orru

Berrypeckers and longbills
Order: PasseriformesFamily: Melanocharitidae

The Melanocharitidae are medium-sized birds which feed on fruit and some insects and other invertebrates. They have drab plumage in greys, browns or black and white. The berrypeckers resemble stout short-billed honeyeaters, and the longbills are like drab sunbirds.

Pygmy longbill, Oedistoma pygmaeum

Australasian robins
Order: PasseriformesFamily: Petroicidae

Most species of Petroicidae have a stocky build with a large rounded head, a short straight bill and rounded wingtips. They occupy a wide range of wooded habitats, from subalpine to tropical rainforest, and mangrove swamp to semi-arid scrubland. All are primarily insectivores, although a few supplement their diet with seeds.

Lemon-bellied flycatcher, Microeca flavigaster
Yellow-legged flycatcher, Microeca griseoceps
Olive flyrobin, Microeca flavovirescens
White-faced robin, Tregellasia leucops
Mangrove robin, Eopsaltria pulverulenta
White-browed robin, Poecilodryas superciliosa
Northern scrub-robin, Drymodes superciliaris
Papuan scrub-robin, Drymodes beccarii

Larks
Order: PasseriformesFamily: Alaudidae

Larks are small terrestrial birds with often extravagant songs and display flights. Most larks are fairly dull in appearance. Their food is insects and seeds.

Horsfield’s bushlark, Mirafra javanica

Cisticolas and allies
Order: PasseriformesFamily: Cisticolidae

The Cisticolidae are warblers found mainly in warmer southern regions of the Old World. They are generally very small birds of drab brown or grey appearance found in open country such as grassland or scrub.

Zitting cisticola, Cisticola juncidis
Golden-headed cisticola, Cisticola exilis

Reed warblers and allies
Order: PasseriformesFamily: Acrocephalidae

The members of this family are usually rather large for "warblers". Most are rather plain olivaceous brown above with much yellow to beige below. They are usually found in open woodland, reedbeds, or tall grass. The family occurs mostly in southern to western Eurasia and surroundings, but it also ranges far into the Pacific, with some species in Africa.

Australian reed warbler, Acrocephalus australis

Grassbirds and allies
Order: PasseriformesFamily: Locustellidae

Locustellidae are a family of small insectivorous songbirds found mainly in Eurasia, Africa, and the Australian region. They are smallish birds with tails that are usually long and pointed, and tend to be drab brownish or buffy all over.

Tawny grassbird, Cincloramphus timoriensis
Gray's grasshopper warbler, Helopsaltes fasciolatus

Swallows
Order: PasseriformesFamily: Hirundinidae

The family Hirundinidae is adapted to aerial feeding. They have a slender streamlined body, long pointed wings and a short bill with a wide gape. The feet are adapted to perching rather than walking, and the front toes are partially joined at the base.

Barn swallow, Hirundo rustica
Welcome swallow, Hirundo neoxena
Pacific swallow, Hirundo tahitica
Red-rumped swallow, Cecropis daurica 
Fairy martin, Petrochelidon ariel
Tree martin, Petrochelidon nigricans

White-eyes, yuhinas, and allies
Order: PasseriformesFamily: Zosteropidae

The white-eyes are small and mostly undistinguished, their plumage above being generally some dull colour like greenish-olive, but some species have a white or bright yellow throat, breast or lower parts, and several have buff flanks. As their name suggests, many species have a white ring around each eye.

Lemon-bellied white-eye, Zosterops chloris
Ashy-bellied white-eye, Zosterops citrinella
Australian yellow white-eye, Zosterops luteus
New Guinea white-eye, Zosterops novaeguineae
Silvereye, Zosterops lateralis

Starlings
Order: PasseriformesFamily: Sturnidae

Starlings are small to medium-sized passerine birds. Their flight is strong and direct and they are very gregarious. Their preferred habitat is fairly open country. They eat insects and fruit. Plumage is typically dark with a metallic sheen.

Metallic starling, Aplonis metallica
Singing starling, Aplonis cantoroides
Yellow-faced myna, Mino dumontii
Common myna, Acridotheres tristis

Flowerpeckers
Order: PasseriformesFamily: Dicaeidae

The flowerpeckers are very small, stout, often brightly coloured birds, with short tails, short thick curved bills and tubular tongues.

Olive-crowned flowerpecker, Dicaeum pectorale
Red-capped flowerpecker, Dicaeum geelvinkianum
Mistletoebird, Dicaeum hirundinaceum

Sunbirds and spiderhunters
Order: PasseriformesFamily: Nectariniidae

The sunbirds and spiderhunters are very small passerine birds which feed largely on nectar, although they will also take insects, especially when feeding young. Flight is fast and direct on their short wings. Most species can take nectar by hovering like a hummingbird, but usually perch to feed.

Black sunbird, Leptocoma sericea
Olive-backed sunbird, Cinnyris jugularis

Waxbills and allies
Order: PasseriformesFamily: Estrildidae

The estrildid finches are small passerine birds of the Old World tropics and Australasia. They are gregarious and often colonial seed eaters with short thick but pointed bills. They are all similar in structure and habits, but have wide variation in plumage colours and patterns.

Red-browed firetail, Neochmia temporalis
Crimson finch, Neochmia phaeton
Star finch, Bathilda ruficauda
Double-barred finch, Stizoptera bichenovii
Streak-headed munia, Mayrimunia tristissima
White-spotted munia, Mayrimunia leucosticta
Gray-crowned munia, Lonchura nevermanni
Chestnut-breasted munia, Lonchura castaneothorax

Old World sparrows
Order: PasseriformesFamily: Passeridae

Old World sparrows are small passerine birds. In general, sparrows tend to be small, plump, brown or grey birds with short tails and short powerful beaks. Sparrows are seed eaters, but they also consume small insects.

House sparrow, Passer domesticus (I)
Eurasian tree sparrow, Passer montanus (I)

Wagtails and pipits
Order: PasseriformesFamily: Motacillidae

Motacillidae is a family of small passerine birds with medium to long tails. They include the wagtails, longclaws and pipits. They are slender, ground feeding insectivores of open country.

Eastern yellow wagtail, Motacilla tschutschensis
Australian pipit, Anthus australis

See also
List of birds
Lists of birds by region

References

 Birding-Aus Mailing List Archives
 Birds Australia Rarities Committee – decisions and case summaries
 Clarke, Rohan H. (2004). The avifauna of northern Torres Strait: notes on a wet season visit. Australian Field Ornithology 21: 49-66.
 Clarke, Rohan H. (2006). Papuan Spine-tailed Swifts Mearnsia novaeguineae on Boigu Island, Torres Strait, Queensland. Australian Field Ornithology 23: 125-129.
 Clarke, Rohan H. (2007). An Orange-bellied Fruit-Dove, Ptilinopus iozonus, on Boigu Island, Torres Strait: The First Record for Australian Territory. Australian Field Ornithology 24: 44-48.
 Draffan, R.D.W.; Garnett, S.T.; & Malone, G.J. (1983). Birds of the Torres Strait: an annotated list and biogeographical analysis. Emu 83: 207-234.
 Morcombe, Michael. (2000). Field Guide to Australian Birds. Steve Parish Publishing: Brisbane. 

°
Torres Strait Islands
Torres Strait